The Saint Joseph's Hawks men's soccer team is a varsity intercollegiate athletic team of Saint Joseph's University in Philadelphia, United States. The team is a member of the Atlantic 10 Conference, which is part of the National Collegiate Athletic Association's Division I. Saint Joseph's first men's soccer team was fielded in 1958. The team plays its home games at Sweeney Field in Philadelphia. The Hawks are coached by Don D'Ambra.

NCAA Tournament appearances 

Saint Joseph's have appeared in three NCAA Tournaments. Their last tournament appearance came in 1972.

Facilities

Sweeney Field

Sweeney Field (previously called Finnesey Field) is a multi-use sports facility on the Saint Joseph's University campus in Philadelphia, Pennsylvania, which opened in 1929 and was originally planned to be the centerpiece to a 70,000 seat football stadium in the natural bowl of the campus.

Coaching history 

Saint Joseph's University has had four coaches in their program's existence.

References

External links 
 

 
Soccer clubs in Philadelphia
1958 establishments in Pennsylvania
Association football clubs established in 1958